Jennifer or Jenifer may refer to:

People
Jennifer (given name)

 Jenifer (singer), French pop singer
 Jennifer Warnes, American singer who formerly used the stage name Jennifer
 Daniel of St. Thomas Jenifer
 Daniel Jenifer

Film and television 

 Jennifer (1953 film), a film starring Ida Lupino
 Jennifer (1978 film), a horror film by Brice Mack
 Jennifer, a 1998 Ghanaian film starring Brew Riverson Jnr
 "Jenifer" (Masters of Horror), an episode of Masters of Horror

Music 

 The Jennifers, a British band, some of whose members later formed Supergrass
 Jenifer (album), an album by French singer Jenifer
 Jennifer (album), a 1972 album by Jennifer Warnes
 "Jennifer", a 1974 song by Faust from Faust IV
 "Jennifer", a 1983 song by Eurythmics from Sweet Dreams (Are Made of This) (album)
 "Jennifer", a 2001 song by M2M from The Big Room

Other uses
 Hurricane Jennifer
 Project Jennifer, a CIA attempt to recover a Soviet submarine in 1974

See also
Le isterie di Jennifer
 
 Jeniffer Viturino (1993–2011), Brazilian fashion model
 Jenny (disambiguation)
 Jenni, a given name
 Jenna, a given name
 Yennifer (disambiguation), a given name

es:Jenni